Soben R. Huon is an American beauty queen from Los Angeles, California, who has competed in the Miss USA pageant.

Huon won the Miss Utah USA 2006 title in late 2005 in her first attempt.  She represented Utah in the Miss USA 2006 pageant broadcast live from Baltimore, Maryland, in April 2006. She was also the first woman of Asian descent to win the Miss Utah USA title.  The pageant was won by Tara Conner of Kentucky.  Huon was one of twenty-six Miss USA Delegates who appeared on a Miss USA special of Deal or No Deal in April 2006, prior to the broadcast of the pageant.

A graduate of Brigham Young University, where she earned a B.A. in Political Science, Soben was a John B. Tsu Fellowship recipient of the International Leadership Foundation. While in Utah, she built lasting cultural connections through her participation as a State Titleholder with the Miss Universe Organization. Thereafter, she spent time in Berlin, Germany, working in a family office where she also studied to gain fluency in German.

Soben Huon is a Vice President at J.P. Morgan Securities, a wealth management division of J.P. Morgan. As a member of The Canell Group, she delivers financial planning and investment analysis to small business owners, retirees, corporate executives, athletes and entertainers.

References

BYU student wins crown, BYU NewsNet, November 28, 2005 (accessed May 1, 2006).
Miss Utah Competing for Miss USA, BYU NewsNet, March 28, 2006 (accessed May 1, 2006).
Miss Soben Huon Competes For Miss USA Title, Voice of America, April 20, 2006 (accessed May 1, 2006).
Miss Utah USA vies in Baltimore, Deseret News, April 27, 2006 (accessed May 1, 2006).
 Soben Huon - Investment Associate, J.P. Morgan (accessed January 9, 2019).

External links 
Miss Utah USA website
Miss USA Official Profile

Living people
Converts to Mormonism
Miss USA 2006 delegates
Latter Day Saints from Utah
American expatriates in Germany
Brigham Young University alumni
People from Provo, Utah
American people of Cambodian descent
Latter Day Saints from California
Year of birth missing (living people)